Burakovo is a rural locality (a village) in Sergeikhinskoye Rural Settlement, Kameshkovsky District, Vladimir Oblast, Russia. The population was 17 as of 2010. There is 1 street.

Geography 
Burakovo is located on the Nerl River, 39 km west of Kameshkovo (the district's administrative centre) by road. Zapolitsy is the nearest rural locality.

References 

Rural localities in Kameshkovsky District